Reticulon 4, also known as Neurite outgrowth inhibitor or Nogo,  is a protein that in humans is encoded by the RTN4 gene that has been identified as an inhibitor of neurite outgrowth specific to the central nervous system. During neural development Nogo is expressed mainly by neurons and provides an inhibitory signal for the migration and sprouting of CNS endothelial (tip) cells, thereby restricting blood vessel density.

This gene belongs to the family of reticulon-encoding genes. Reticulons are associated with the endoplasmic reticulum, and are involved in neuroendocrine secretion or in membrane trafficking in neuroendocrine cells. The product of this gene is a potent neurite outgrowth inhibitor that may also help block the regeneration of the central nervous system in higher vertebrates. Alternatively spliced transcript variants derived both from differential splicing and differential promoter usage and encoding different isoforms have been identified. There are three isoforms: Nogo A, B and C. Nogo-A has two known inhibitory domains including amino-Nogo, at the N-terminus and Nogo-66, which makes up the molecules extracellular loop. Both amino-Nogo and Nogo-66 are involved in inhibitory responses, where amino-Nogo is a strong inhibitor of neurite outgrowth, and Nogo-66 is involved in growth cone destruction.

Research suggests that blocking Nogo-A during neuronal damage (from diseases such as multiple sclerosis) will help to protect or restore the damaged neurons. The investigation into the mechanisms of this protein presents a great potential for the treatment of auto-immune mediated demyelinating diseases and spinal cord injury regeneration. It has also been found to be a key player in the process whereby physical exercise enhances learning and memory processes in the brain.  Nogo-A has also been shown to negatively regulate vascular growth and repair following ischemic stroke. Genetic deletion and antibody-mediated blockage of Nogo-A led to enhanced re-vascularization and functional recovery in an experimental mouse model of stroke. Moreover, vascular leakage, a major complication following stroke, was reduced following anti-Nogo-A antibody treatment.

Interactions 

Reticulon 4 has been shown to interact with WWP1, BCL2-like 1 and Bcl-2.

See also 
Reticulon 4 receptor

References

Further reading 

 
 
 
 
 
 
 
 
 
 
 
 
 
 
 
 
 
 
 
 
 
 

Enzyme inhibitors